Walter Blount (by 1506 – 1561) was an English politician.

He was a Member (MP) of the Parliament of England for Worcestershire in March 1553 and November 1554.

References

1561 deaths
Year of birth uncertain
English MPs 1553 (Edward VI)
English MPs 1554–1555
Members of the Parliament of England for Worcestershire